Shamar Sands (born 30 April 1985) is a Bahamian track and field athlete who specialises in the 110 metres hurdles. He is the Bahamian national record holder in the event with 13.40 seconds. Sands is the cousin of triple jumper Leevan Sands and also has a degree in accounting.

Sands made his first appearance at a major tournament in 2001, competing at the World Youth Championships in Athletics. He reached the semi-finals of 110 m hurdles but finished with a disappointing 14.36 seconds, over half a second slower than the personal best he had set the previous day. He performed well in the 2002 World Junior Championships, taking the bronze medal in the 110 m hurdles (91.4 cm) event, setting a personal best of 13.67 seconds with a strong tail wind.

His first major senior tournament came in 2007: although he had improved his best to 13.47 seconds that summer, he failed to progress beyond the heats at the Osaka World Championships. The following year he attended his first major indoor tournament, but did not get past the heats, recording a sub-par 7.97 seconds in the 60 metre hurdles at the 2008 World Indoor Championships. He qualified to represent his country at the 2008 Beijing Olympics and reached the quarter-finals.

The 2009 season began with significant improvements for Sands. He registered a 60 m hurdles best of 7.49 seconds in the indoor season and set the national record in the 110 m hurdles at the 2009 Osaka Grand Prix. He was pleased with both the achievement and winning the race, which he had done despite hitting two of the hurdles.

Sands was coached most of his professional career by Henry Rolle.

Personal bests

References

External links
Q & A with Auburn Tigers

1985 births
Living people
Bahamian male hurdlers
Olympic athletes of the Bahamas
Athletes (track and field) at the 2008 Summer Olympics
Athletes (track and field) at the 2012 Summer Olympics
Auburn Tigers men's track and field athletes
Auburn University alumni